Events in the year 1920 in Norway.

Incumbents
Monarch – Haakon VII

Events

 9 February – The League of Nations gives Spitsbergen to Norway.
 17–19 June – The Centre Party was founded.
 Aalesund ship is discovered embedded in the earth south of Ålesund.

Popular culture

Sports

Helge Løvland, won the Olympic gold medal in the decathlon.

Music

Film

Literature
Knut Hamsund was awarded  the Nobel Prize in literature for the novel Markens Grøde (Growth of the Soil, 2017).
 The Knut Hamsund novel Konerne ved Vandposten Volume 1 & 2 (The Women at the Pump), was published.
The third Sigrid Undset for the trilogy of Kristin Lavransdatter was published.
The Olav Duun novel Storbybryllope (The Big Wedding) from the work Juvikfolket (The People of Juvik, 1918–23), was published.

Notable births

2 January – Anne-Sofie Østvedt, resistance leader (died 2009)
7 January – Anders Bratholm, jurist and professor of jurisprudence (died 2010)
10 January – Rut Brandt, writer and second wife of the German Chancellor Willy Brandt (died 2006)
11 January – Ole Henrik Moe, pianist, art historian and art critic (died 2013).
14 January – Helge Rognlien, politician and Minister (died 2001)
19 January – Kåre Olafsen, resistance member, executed (died 1945)
20 January – Thorleif Schjelderup, ski jumper, Olympic bronze medallist and author (died 2006)
27 January – Gudmund Saxrud, civil servant and diplomat (died 2003)
4 February – Ole J. Kleppa, physical chemist (died 2007)
8 February – Sverre Farstad, speed skater and Olympic gold medallist (died 1978)
15 February – Anne-Catharina Vestly, children's author (died 2008)
17 February – Ivo Caprino, film director and writer (died 2001)
21 February – Per Øisang, journalist and radio and television presenter (died 1967)
3 March – Henry Gundersen, resistance member, executed (died 1945)
10 March – Finn Ferner, sailor and Olympic silver medallist (died 2001)
11 March – Kåre Kristiansen, politician (died 2005)
19 March – Kjell Aukrust, author, poet and artist (died 2002)
21 March – Trygve Moe, politician (died 1998)
23 March – Lorentz Eldjarn, biochemist and medical doctor (died 2007)
29 March – Hans Methlie Michelsen, judge (died 2014)
4 April – Dagfinn Grønoset, author (died 2008)
8 April – Kristian Asdahl, politician (died 2000)
9 April – Otto Nes, television manager (died 2014)
10 April – Jakob Aano, politician (died 2016)
12 April – Audun Hetland, illustrator (died 1998)
19 April – Ragnar Ulstein, journalist, writer and resistance member (died 2019).
22 April – Adolf Bogstad, resistance member, executed (died 1945)
28 April – Egil Endresen, jurist and politician (died 1992)
7 May – Einar Wøhni, politician (died 1987)
10 May – Olaf Kortner, politician (died 1998)
11 May − Per Jorsett, sports reporter (died 2019)
29 May – Bjarne Aagard Strøm, politician (died 2008)
6 June – Tormod Førland, chemist (died 1995).
14 June – Ivar Mathisen, sprint canoer and Olympic silver medallist (died 2008)
30 June – Hans Kristian Seip, forester (died 2012)
2 July – Lars T. Platou, electrical engineer and politician (died 2003)
9 July – Ragnhild Magerøy, novelist and essayist (died 2010).
13 July – Jens Christian Magnus, military officer and politician (died 2017)
15 July – Gudmund Grytøyr, politician (died 2001)
21 July – Gunnar Thoresen, international soccer player (died 2017)
21 July – Harald Warholm, politician (died 1967)
22 July – Ingvar Bakken, politician (died 1982)
25 July – Merete Skavlan, actress, theatre instructor and director (died 2018)
27 July – Olaf Poulsen, speed skater and president of the International Skating Union (died 2008)
31 July – Per Hysing-Dahl, politician (died 1989)
9 August – Kjeld Langeland, politician (died 1973)
20 September – Rolf Kirkvaag, journalist and radio and television personality (died 2003)
6 October – Edvard Beyer, literary historian, literary critic and professor (died 2003)
9 October – Jens Bjørneboe, writer (died 1976)
9 October – Jens Boyesen, diplomat and politician (died 1996)
24 October – Per Saugstad, psychologist and professor (died 2010)
26 October – Anne Valen Hestetun, politician (died 2009)
3 November – Guttorm Hansen, writer and politician (died 2009)
3 November – Gerhard Knoop, stage producer and theatre director (died 2009)
27 November – Johannes Bråten, politician (died 1997)
5 December – Hallvard Eika, politician and Minister (died 1989)
8 December – Ivar Martinsen, speed skater (died 2018)
12 December – Tollef Landsverk, judge and civil servant (died 1988)
19 December – Trygve Brudevold, bobsledder (died 2021)

Full date missing
Sverre Bergh, spy in Nazi Germany during World War II (died 2006)
Bjarte Birkeland, literary researcher (died 2000)
Jens-Halvard Bratz, businessman, politician and Minister (died 2005)
Rolf Arthur Hansen, politician and minister (died 2006)
Simen Skjønsberg, journalist and writer (died 1993)

Notable deaths

3 April – Fernanda Nissen, journalist, literary critic, theatre critic, politician and feminist pioneer (born 1862)
18 May – Johan Henrik Paasche Thorne, businessperson and politician (born 1843)
17 July – Christopher Bruun, Norwegian priest and educator.

Full date unknown
Anders Bergene, businessperson (born 1855)
Oskar Fredriksen, speed skater (born 1872)
Knut Gunnarsson Helland, Hardanger fiddle maker (born 1880)
Baard Iversen, businessperson and politician (born 1836)
Olaj Olsen, jurist and politician (born 1851)
Steinar Schjøtt, philologist and lexicographer (born 1844)
Andreas Lauritz Thune, engineer and businessman (born 1848)

See also

References

External links

 
Norway
Norway